Idiris Muse Elmi (died August 24, 2010) was a Somali politician, a member of the Transitional Federal Parliament.  He was among the people killed in the attack on the Hotel Muna in Mogadishu by al-Shabaab as were fellow parliamentarians Mohamed Hassan M. Nur, Geddi Abdi Gadid, and Bulle Hassan Mo'allim Idiris was from northern regions specially Lughaya Awdal Region(Badaraxaan).

References

2010 deaths
Members of the Transitional Federal Parliament
Assassinated Somalian politicians
People murdered in Somalia
Year of birth missing